André Leducq (27 February 1904 – 18 June 1980) was a French cyclist who won the 1930 and 1932 Tours de France. He also won a gold medal at the 1924 Summer Olympics in the team road race event and the 1928 Paris–Roubaix.

Career

Leducq was born at Saint-Ouen. He was world champion in 1924 as an amateur before turning professional in 1927. The following year he won Paris–Roubaix and was second in the Tour de France, becoming popular for his humour. His other victories included two Tours de France (he won 25 stages in nine rides) and the 1931 Paris–Tours. He has the fourth-highest number of stage wins in the Tour de France (behind Eddy Merckx, Bernard Hinault, and Mark Cavendish).

After his retirement, he founded a professional cycling team that raced in the 1950s.

Career achievements

Major results

1927
 Tour de France
 4th overall
Stage 6, 23 and 24 wins
1928
Tour de France
 2nd overall
Stage 2, 10, 11 and 16 wins
Paris–Roubaix
1929
Tour de France
 1 day in yellow jersey
 Stage 2, 11, 17, 18 and 21 wins
1930
Tour de France
 1st overall
 13 days in yellow jersey
 Stage 5 and 16 wins
1931
Tour de France
 10th overall
 Stage 20 win
 Paris–Tours
1932
Tour de France
 1st overall
 19 days in yellow jersey
 Stage 3, 11, 13, 15, 20 and 21 wins
1933
Tour de France
 31st overall
 Stage 13 and 14 wins
Critérium International
1935
Tour de France
 17th overall
 Stage 18b ITT win
1938
Tour de France
 2 days in yellow jersey
 Stage 21 win (joint with Antonin Magne)

Grand Tour results timeline

References

External links
Complete results (in French)

1904 births
1980 deaths
People from Saint-Ouen-sur-Seine
French male cyclists
French Tour de France stage winners
Tour de France winners
Olympic cyclists of France
Cyclists at the 1924 Summer Olympics
Burials at the Cimetière parisien de Bagneux
Medalists at the 1924 Summer Olympics
Olympic gold medalists for France
Sportspeople from Seine-Saint-Denis
Olympic medalists in cycling
Cyclists from Île-de-France